Interstate 480 (I-480) is a  auxiliary Interstate Highway of I-80 in the US state of Ohio that passes through much of the Greater Cleveland area, including the southern parts of the city of Cleveland. I-480 is one of 13 auxiliary Interstate Highways in the state. The western terminus of I-480 is an interchange with I-80 and the Ohio Turnpike in North Ridgeville. Starting east through suburban Lorain County, I-480 enters Cuyahoga County, then approaches Cleveland Hopkins International Airport, which serves as the primary airport for Northeast Ohio. After traversing Brooklyn and crossing the Cuyahoga River on the Valley View Bridge, the highway continues east toward the communities of Bedford and Twinsburg toward its eastern terminus at I-80 and the Ohio Turnpike in Streetsboro. In 1998, the governor of Ohio, George Voinovich, gave I-480 the additional name of the "Senator John Glenn Highway", in honor of the former NASA astronaut and US senator from Ohio for 24 years.

Parts of I-480 were to have been I-271 and/or I-80N.

Route description

I-271 and I-480 were the only two auxiliary Interstates in the nation that ran concurrently with each other for any distance until 2022, when a concurrency between I-587 and I-795 in North Carolina was established with the designation of I-587. This is because I-80 was concurrent with I-271 until 1971, when I-80 was routed back on to the turnpike and replaced by I-480.

Due to the convergence of these high traffic roads, congestion is common during peak times. They run concurrently through Bedford Heights, Bedford, and Oakwood in Cuyahoga County. Because of that, the Ohio Department of Transportation (ODOT) started a $120-million (equivalent to $ in ) widening project in 2016, expanding the concurrency to five lanes in each direction. The project is expected to be completed in late 2020.
 

It is the busiest crossing in the state of Ohio with approximately 180,000 cars per day. An expansion and deck replacement project began in 2018, which includes building a third bridge between the existing bridges to allow for deck replacement of the existing bridges with minimal disruption of traffic. When completed, scheduled for 2024, plans call for the bridges to carry six lanes of traffic in each direction.

History
I-480 was conceived as a means of giving motorists a faster way of crossing Cleveland's southern borders and suburbs. The first segment of the route was partially concurrent with I-271 and constructed simultaneously with that highway in 1965. Planning for the route was largely finished by 1968, and construction began on its first mile began at the highway's interchange with I-77 in 1970.

The segment from Bedford west to Maple Heights opened in November 1976. The segment from Maple Heights west to Brooklyn Heights opened in January 1978.

Construction from west to east began as political controversies and engineering work were resolved on the highway's middle section. I-480 between I-80 and I-71 was completed in 1983.

The  of the route north and northeast of Cleveland Hopkins International Airport proved the most difficult to plan due to existing high levels of traffic on Brookpark Road and the expansion requirements of the airport.

The final $115-million (equivalent to $ in ),  segment linking the east and west ends of I-480 was finished in August 1987.

Exit list

Interstate 480N

Interstate 480N (I-480N) is officially designated as the spur freeway connecting I-480 to I-271 and US Route 422 (US 422) by ODOT. It is currently signed as I-480 on interchange signs and is signed as I-480N on milemarkers.

Major intersections

References

External links

 Interstate 480 (Ohio) Endpoint Photos

80-4 Ohio
80-4
4 Ohio
Cleveland area expressways
Transportation in Lorain County, Ohio
Transportation in Cuyahoga County, Ohio
Transportation in Summit County, Ohio
Transportation in Portage County, Ohio